Doğan Media Group (Doğan Yayın Holding A.Ş.) was a Turkish media conglomerate, part of the Doğan Holding conglomerate. The company was established in 1997 to bring together Doğan's media properties. These include the Posta, Hürriyet (including Fanatik), and Radikal newspapers, the television channels Kanal D and CNN Türk, and the Doğan News Agency. It also operated Doğan Kitap, a major book publisher, and Doğan Music Company, a major music label. Doğan also operated print facilities and media distribution, for other newspapers and magazines as well as its own.

From 1979 to 2011, Doğan Media Group owned Milliyet and Vatan.

In August 2014, Doğan Holding announced its plan to take over Doğan Media Group with all its assets and liabilities and absorb it. The takeover was completed on 26 August 2014 and Doğan Media Group was dissolved. Doğan Holding chairperson Begüm Faralyalı said the merger would lead to a 'more simple management'. In 22 March 2018, all of the media group was sold to Demirören Group for $1.1 billion price.

Properties

Newspapers 
 1979–2011: Milliyet (acquired from Ercüment Karacan; sold to Demirören Group)
 1994–2018: Hürriyet 
 1995–2018: Posta
 1995–2018: Fanatik
 1996–2016: Radikal
 1996–2007: Gözcü
 2002–2011: Vatan (sold to Demirören Group)

Television 
 1994–2018: Kanal D (acquired from Ayhan Şahenk)
 1995–2000: Eko TV
 1996–2018: Euro D
 1999–2018: CNN Türk (50% with Turner Broadcasting System Europe) 
 1999–2003: Süper Kanal
 2005–2011: Star TV (acquired from TMSF; sold to Ferit Şahenk)
 2006–2011: Euro Star (sold to Ferit Şahenk)
 2007–2018: Kanal D Romania
 2008–2012: TNT Turkey (50% with Turner Broadcasting System Europe) 
 2008–2018: Cartoon Network (50% with Turner Broadcasting System Europe) 
 2011–2018: NBA TV (acquired from Ferit Şahenk) (50% with Turner Broadcasting System Europe) 
 2012–2018: TV2 (Turkey)

Radio 
 2005–: Slow Türk
 1994–2018: Radio D
 2001–2018: CNN Türk Radio
 2006–2012: Radio Moda

Digital Platform 
 D-Smart
 D-Smart Avrupa

References

External links
 Doğan Media Group 

 
Mass media companies of Turkey
Newspaper companies of Turkey
Mass media companies established in 1997
Companies disestablished in 2014
2014 disestablishments in Turkey
Turkish companies established in 1997
Defunct companies of Turkey